José van der Ploeg (born 4 May 1958) is a Spanish sailor who competed in the 1992 Summer Olympics in Barcelona, where he won gold medal in the Finn Class.

References

External links

1958 births
Spanish male sailors (sport)
Sailors at the 1992 Summer Olympics – Finn
Sailors at the 1996 Summer Olympics – Finn
Sailors at the 2000 Summer Olympics – Star
Olympic sailors of Spain
Olympic gold medalists for Spain
Living people
Olympic medalists in sailing
Medalists at the 1992 Summer Olympics
20th-century Spanish people